Dibru-Saikhowa National Park is a national park located in Dibrugarh and Tinsukia districts, Assam, India.

The park is bounded by the Brahmaputra and Lohit rivers in the north and Dibru River in the south. It mainly consists of moist mixed semi-evergreen forests, moist mixed deciduous forests, canebrakes and grasslands. It is the largest salix swamp forest in north-eastern India, with a tropical monsoon climate with a hot and wet summer and cool and usually dry winter. It is a haven for many endangered species and rich in fish diversity. In December 2020, Gauhati highcourt stayed a permission given to Oil India Limited for hydrocarbon exploration at seven locations inside the protected area.

Conservation

The area was declared as Dibru Reserved Forest in 1890. In 1920, additional area was added to the Dibru Reserve Forest. In 1929, Saikhowa Reserve Forest was declared. In 1933, more area was added to the Dibru RF. In 1986, an area of 650 km2 was preliminarily declared as a wildlife sanctuary, out of which finally 340 km2 was declared as wildlife sanctuary in 1995. In 1997, Dibru-Saikhowa Biosphere Reserve was declared with an area of 765 km2 that included the 340 km2 of sanctuary area as the core. In 1999, the 340 km2 of sanctuary area was declared as national park.

Originally created to help conserve the habitat of the rare white-winged wood duck, the park is also home to other rare creatures such as water buffalo, black-breasted parrotbill, tiger and capped langur. The park also has some eco lodges.

Flora
The forest of Dibru-Saikhowa consists of semi-evergreen forests, deciduous, littoral and swamp forests and patches of wet evergreen forests. The national park is about 35.84% moist mixed forest, 9.50% degraded forest and 21.25% grassland. Major tree species of the area are tetrasperma, Dillenia indica, Bischofia javanica, Bombax ceiba, Lagerstroemia parviflora, Terminalia myriocarpa, Mesua ferrea, Dalbergia sissoo, and Ficus.  Arundo donax, Imperata cylindrica, Phragmites karka, Saccharum ravennae are principal types of grasses in the national park. 35 species of epiphytic orchids and 8 species of terrestrial orchid are recorded.

Fauna

Mammals: 36 mammal species have been recorded, of which 12 are listed in Schedule 1 of the Wildlife (Protection) Act of 1972. Species include Bengal tiger, Indian leopard, clouded leopard, jungle cat, sloth bear, dhole, small Indian civet, Malayan giant squirrel, Chinese pangolin, Ganges dolphin, slow loris, pig tailed macaque, Assamese macaque, rhesus macaque, capped langur, Hoolock gibbon, Asian elephant, wild boar, Sambar deer, hog deer, barking deer, Asiatic water buffalo, and feral horse. The park is one of the few places in the world which is home to feral horses. They are descendants of horses who bolted out of stables set up by the British Army in and around Tinsukia during World War II.

Reptiles: two species of monitor lizard, eight turtle species and eight snake species have been recorded.

Birds recorded include greater adjutant, ferruginous pochard, Jerdon's babbler, black-breasted parrotbill, marsh babbler, puff-throated babbler, Jerdon's bushchat, rufous-rumped grassbird, chestnut-crowned bush warbler, swamp francolin, spot-billed pelican, white-bellied heron, grey heron, purple heron, black-crowned night heron, yellow bittern, Asian openbill, lesser adjutant, white-necked stork, black stork, black-necked stork, glossy ibis, fulvous whistling-duck, bar-headed goose, greylag goose, northern pintail, common shelduck, white-winged wood duck, Indian spot-billed duck, Baer's pochard,   white-tailed eagle, Pallas's fish eagle, grey-headed fish eagle, greater spotted eagle, Himalayan griffon, white-backed vulture, slender-billed vulture, osprey, crested serpent-eagle, lesser kestrel, Sarus crane, Bengal florican, brown fish owl, great pied hornbill, spotted redshank, greenshank, and pale-capped pigeon.

See also

 List of protected areas of India
 Indian Council of Forestry Research and Education

References

External links
Dibru-Saikhowa National Park - Dibru-Saikhowa Conservation Society
Dibru-Saikhowa National Park - portal

Brahmaputra Valley semi-evergreen forests
Tinsukia
National parks in Assam
1999 establishments in Assam
Protected areas established in 1999
Uninhabited islands of India